Gulnara-Klara Samat (born 20 August 1963) is a Kyrgyzstani politician and diplomat. Since 2021, she become an ambassador to Russia and Armenia.

References 

Kyrgyzstani women diplomats
21st-century Kyrgyzstani women politicians
21st-century Kyrgyzstani politicians
Ambassadors of Kyrgyzstan to Russia
Members of the Supreme Council (Kyrgyzstan)
Ambassadors of Kyrgyzstan to Armenia
1963 births
Living people